Prince Gabriele of Bourbon-Two Sicilies (Gabriele Maria Giuseppe Carlo Ignazio Antonio Alfonso Pietro Giovanni Gerardo di Majella et Omni Sancti; 11 January 1897, Cannes, France – 22 October 1975, Itu, Brazil,) was a prince of the deposed dynasty which ruled the Kingdom of the Two Sicilies.

Family
Gabriel was the twelfth child and youngest son of Prince Alfonso, Count of Caserta, and his wife, Princess Maria Antonietta of Bourbon-Two Sicilies. Nicknamed Onga within his family circle, he grew up having little contact with either of the two elder brothers, Carlo (1870-1949) and Ranieri (1883-1973), whose rival claims for headship of the family and its dynastic orders "would rend loyalties the House of Bourbon-Sicily asunder into the 21st century".<ref name="cannes">{{cite book|author1= McIntosh, David |author2=Beéche, Arturo E.|title= Royal Exiles in Cannes|year = 2015|publisher=Eurohistory|location= East Richmond Heights, California |pages= 109, 168, 170, 173–174, 181, 183, 185|isbn=978-0-9854603-8-9}}</ref>

Marriage and issue
Gabriel married firstly Princess Malgorzata Izabella Czartoryska, daughter of Prince Adam Ludwik Czartoryski and his wife Countess Maria Ludwika Krasińska, on 25 August 1927 in Paris. The couple had one child before Malgorzata died in Cannes on 8 March 1929:

Prince Antoine of Bourbon-Two Sicilies (born 20 January 1929 in Cannes – died 11 November 2019)
 wed Duchess Elisabeth of Württemberg (born 2 February 1933 in Stuttgart; died 29 January 2022) on 18 July 1958 in Altshausen, and had issue:
Prince Franz of Bourbon-Two Sicilies (born 20 June 1960 in Ravensburg)
wed Countess Alexandra of Schönborn-Wiesentheid (born 2 June 1967 in Zürich), on 2 June 2000 in Geneva, and had issue:
Prince Antoine of Bourbon-Two Sicilies (born 6 June 2003 in Geneva)
Princess Dorothée of Bourbon-Two Sicilies (born 10 May 2005 in Zürich)
Princess Maria Carolina of Bourbon-Two Sicilies (born 18 July 1962 in Friedrichshafen)
wed Andreas Baumbach (born 30 April 1963 in Tübingen), on 6 May 1988 in Tübingen
Prince Gennaro of Bourbon-Two Sicilies (born 27 January 1966 in Ravensburg)
Princess Maria Annunziata of Bourbon-Two Sicilies (born 18 February 1973 in Friedrichshafen)
∞ Count Carl Fredrik Creutz (born 11 November 1971), on 2 August 2003 in Helsinki, and had issue.

Gabriel married, secondly, Princess Cecylia Lubomirska, daughter of Prince Kasimierz Lubomirski and his wife Countess Maria Theresia Granow-Wodicka, on 15 September 1932 in Kraków. Gabriel and Cecylia had four children:
Prince Jean of Bourbon-Two Sicilies (born 30 June 1933 in Warsaw – died 25 December 2000 in Madrid)
Princess Maria Margarita of Bourbon-Two Sicilies (born 16 November 1934 in Warsaw – died 15 January 2014 in Madrid)
wed Luis Gonzaga Maldonado y Gordon (born 17 November 1932 in Madrid), on 11 June 1962 in Jerez de la Frontera
Princess Marie Immaculata of Bourbon-Two Sicilies (born 25 June 1937 in Warsaw – died 14 May 2020 in Mallorca)
 wed Miguel García de Saéz y Tellecea  (6 September 1921 – 12 March 1982), on 29 June 1970 in Sant Josep de sa Talaia; divorced in 1979
Prince Casimir of Bourbon-Two Sicilies (born 8 November 1938 in Warsaw)
 wed Princess Maria Cristina of Savoy-Aosta  (born 12 September 1933 in Miramare), on 29 January 1967 in Jacarezinho
Prince Luís of Bourbon-Two Sicilies (born 28 November 1970 in Rio de Janeiro)
 wed firstly, Christine Apovian (born 20 May 1969) on 22 October 1998 in São Paulo, subsequently divorced
Anna Sophia di Borbone-Dos Sicilias (born 9 April 1999 in São Paulo)
 wed secondly, Maria da Glória Ganem Rubião
 Maria Isabel di Borbone-Dos Sicilias (2012)
 Luisa Fernanda di Borbone-Dos Sicilias (2014)
 Paulo Afonso di Borbone-Dos Sicilias (2014)
Princess Anna Cecilia of Bourbon-Two Sicilies (born 24 December 1971 in São Paulo)
wed Count Rodolphe de Causans (born 22 January 1973) civilly on 18 August 2005 in Les Verchers-sur-Layon, religiously on 19 September 2005 in Turin, and had issue.
Princess Elena Sofia of Bourbon-Two Sicilies (born 10 September 1973 in São Paulo)
Prince Alexander of Bourbon-Two Sicilies (born 9 August 1974 in São Paulo). Ordained a priest in Rome on 22 December 2007.

Titles, styles, honours, and arms

Titles and styles
11 January 1897 – 22 October 1975: His Royal Highness Prince Gabriele of Bourbon-Two Sicilies

In addition to the princely status deriving from membership in the historical House of Bourbon-Two Sicilies, the title of Principe de Borbón and the style of Royal Highness'' were specifically accorded to Gabriel de Borbón and to those of his children born of marriage contracted with the Spanish sovereign's authorization, by a Spanish royal decree issued 19 August 1920.

Honours
: Knight of the Order of the Golden Fleece
: Knight of the Order of Saint Januarius
Bailiff Grand Cross of the Sacred Military Constantinian Order of Saint George
Knight Grand Cross of the Order of Charles III
Knight of Honor and Devotion of the Sovereign Military Order of Malta

Ancestry

References

1897 births
1975 deaths
People from Cannes
Princes of Bourbon-Two Sicilies
Knights of the Golden Fleece of Spain
Knights of Malta
19th-century Roman Catholics
20th-century Roman Catholics
French Roman Catholics
Brazilian Roman Catholics